Harold James Perkin (11 November 1926 – 16 October 2004) was a distinguished English social historian who was the founder of the Social History Society in 1976.

Background
Perkin was born in Hanley, Staffordshire of humble origins. He attended Hanley High School and won a scholarship to Jesus College, Cambridge from 1945, gaining a starred First Class degree in 1948. After National Service in the RAF, he was rejected by his Cambridge college to study for a PhD. He began extramural history teaching from 1950 with the University of Manchester.

Academic career
Perkin was a Lecturer in Social History at the University of Manchester (1951–1965), then a Senior Lecturer (1965–1967), a Professor (1967–1984) in Social History and Director of the Centre for Social History (1974–84) at the University of Lancaster, and an Emeritus Professor of History at Northwestern University, Illinois (1985–1997). In addition, he held a visiting professorship at Rice University, founded the Social History Society and was Chairman (1976–1991), and served as chief salary negotiator for the Association of University Teachers, of which he was later President. Perkin was a distinguished, pioneering social historian, whose interests included Transport.

Publications

Television
Television shows for Granada TV
The Age of the Railway, 1970
The Age of the Automobile, 1976

Both were later issued in book form.

References

External links
Harold Perkin Entry at 'Making History' website, Institute of Historical Research, University of London. Accessed December 2011

Social historians
Rice University staff
Alumni of Jesus College, Cambridge
Academics of the Victoria University of Manchester
Academics of Lancaster University
People from Hanley, Staffordshire
Northwestern University faculty
1926 births
2004 deaths
Place of death missing
20th-century British historians
People educated at Hanley High School
21st-century British historians
20th-century British male writers
21st-century British male writers
20th-century Royal Air Force personnel